Phillips Township may refer to one of the following places:

Canada

 Phillips Township, Kenora District, Ontario

United States

 Phillips Township, White County, Illinois
 Phillips Township, Coal County, Oklahoma

See also

Phillips (disambiguation)

Township name disambiguation pages